The Gaylord Herald Times is the twice-weekly newspaper of Gaylord, Michigan, United States.

History 
The Gaylord Herald Times was founded in 1875. The paper started publishing twice weekly in May 1999. In 2006, it was purchased by Schurz Communications purchased the paper along with its sister publications, the Petoskey News-Review and the Charlevoix Courier in 2006. It was sold again to GateHouse Media in 2019.

References

External links
 

Newspapers published in Michigan
Otsego County, Michigan
Publications established in 1875
1875 establishments in Michigan
Gannett publications